The Central League was a professional baseball league that played for one season, 1888. The teams that played in the league were the Allentown Peanuts, Binghamton Crickets, Hazleton Pugilists, Jersey City Skeeters, Newark Trunkmakers, Scranton Miners and Wilkes-Barre Barons. The league champion was the Newark Trunkmakers, who went 83–23.

Standings & statistics 
 President: John W. Collins 
Binghamton disbanded August 3; Hazleton entered the league August 9

References

Defunct minor baseball leagues in the United States
Baseball leagues in New Jersey
Baseball leagues in Pennsylvania
1888 in American sports